Miengo Fútbol Club is a Spanish football club based in Miengo, Cantabria. Founded in 1968, it plays in Regional Preferente – Group A, holding home games at Campo Miengo, with a capacity of 1,000 people.

Season to season

3 seasons in Tercera División

References

External links
Fútbol Regional team profile 
Fútbol Regional team profile 
Soccerway team profile

Football clubs in Cantabria
Association football clubs established in 1968
1968 establishments in Spain